RDI Video Systems (Rick Dyer Industries) was a video game company founded by Rick Dyer originally as Advanced Microcomputer Systems, and was well known for its Laserdisc video games, beginning with the immensely popular Dragon's Lair. The company went bankrupt shortly after releasing the Halcyon gaming console.

Games
Zzyzzyxx (1982)
Dragon's Lair (1983)
Space Ace (1984)
Thayer's Quest (1984) (Released first for the Halcyon, and later in arcades)
Raiders vs. Chargers (1985) (Released first for the Halcyon, and later in arcades as NFL Football)
Orpheus, not released
The Spirits of Whittier Mansion, not released
The Shadow of the Stars, not released
Voyage to the New World, not released
Dallas vs. Washington, not released

Defunct video game companies of the United States